Konstantinos 'Kostas' Fortounis (born 16 October 1992) is a Greek professional footballer who plays as an attacking midfielder or a winger for Super League club Olympiacos and the Greece national team. He was born in Trikala, Thessaly but comes from the nearby village of Sarakina, close to the town of Kalabaka.

Club career

Trikala
After leaving Olympiacos' youth team in 2008, Fortounis moved to Trikala to play for AO Trikala. After an impressive spell in the Under-21 side scoring four goals in 14 matches, he began his career with the first team in the fourth division, where from 2008–2010 he played in 13 matches and scored 1 goal.

Asteras Tripolis
Because of his good appearances with the Greece under-17 national team, Vangelis Vlachos, Asteras Tripolis' manager convinced him to join the Peloponeesean team. He made his debut in a draw with PAOK in Tripolis. Used predominantly as a substitute, the teenager clocked up 24 league appearances, scoring his first Super League goal on 19 September 2010 in a 2–2 draw at AEK Athens, unable, however, to save the side from relegation.
Due to his good performances at Asteras, Juventus made an offer in the winter transfer window for a loan transfer until summer with an option to buy him. Asteras finally declined Juventus's offer.

1. FC Kaiserslautern
In the 2011 summer transfer window, Fortounis moved to Kaiserslautern on a contract until June 2015 after being transferred for an undisclosed fee. In his first season with the club, the midfielder made 28 league appearances but endured a second successive relegation. He reportedly attracted interest from Dutch champions Ajax and Italian champions Juventus midway through the season.

In the 2012–13 season he scored twice in 24 appearances as he helped Kaiserslautern to a third-place finish in the German second tier only to miss out on promotion due to defeat in the promotion/relegation play-off with Hoffenheim. On 16 April 2014, he missed his first final of his career in the semifinal of DFB-Pokal by facing as a substitute a 5–1 loss from the German champions Bayern Munich.

Olympiacos
On 21 July 2014, Fortounis signed a five-year contract with Olympiacos, returning after six years. He said he chose the club ahead of PAOK and Panathinaikos because they could offer him Champions League football, but was left out of the squad for that competition. He scored his first goal for Olympiacos in the Superleague match against PAS Giannina on 6 December, a penalty kick in a 2–2 draw, and went on to score 7 goals from 25 appearances in the 2014–15 Superleague. Fortounis helped Olympiacos reach the 2015 Cup Final, in which he scored the third goal with a  free kick as they beat Skoda Xanthi 3–1 to complete the double with a record 27th cup win.

Fortounis scored Olympiacos' first goal of the 2015–16 Superleague season in a 3–0 win over Panionios. In the second match of the season, against Levadiakos, he secured the victory by scoring the second goal in stoppage time and was named "Man of the Match". On 22 September 2015, he scored twice in Olympiacos's 3–1 defeat of Skoda Xanthi and assisted Jimmy Durmaz for the opening goal. He was again named "Man of the Match". He scored for the second league match running against PAS Giannina in a 5–1 home win. On 29 September, away to Arsenal in the Champions League group stage, he was involved in Felipe Pardo's opening goal and his corner led to goalkeeper David Ospina fumbling the ball over the goalline to give Olympiacos a 2–1 lead, a performance that earned him a spot in the Champions League Team of the Week. On the seventh matchday of the Superleague he scored two goals in a 4–0 home win against AEK after being brought onto the pitch in the second half.

Fortounis missed a penalty before making an assist in the 90th minute to secure a 2–1 victory over 10-man Dinamo Zagreb in the Champions League in November. He netted twice (one penalty) helping his club to reach a 3–1 home win against his former club Asteras Tripoli on 29 November; it was the 11th win in a row for the club equalling the club record from the 1966–67 season. On 5 December, he scored a penalty in a 4–3 away win against Panthrakikos. Two weeks later Fortounis converted two penalties in a 2–0 victory against Kalloni, their 15th win of the first half of the season during which they remained unbeaten. On 31 January 2016, he scored a brace and assisted once in his club's 3–0 win over PAS Giannina at Zosimades Stadium. He scored his first goal in European competition on 25 February with a penalty kick in a 2–1 home defeat to Anderlecht that eliminated Olympiacos from the 2015–16 Europa League at the round of 32 stage. On 20 March, Fortounis became the third player in Olympiacos' history to score 10 goals and make 10 assists in a season (after Predrag Đorđević in 2001–02, 2002–03 and 2003–04, and Chori Dominguez in 2014–15). In the final match of the Superleague season, Fortounis scored his 18th goal, which made him the league's top scorer by a three-goal margin; he was also the top assister with 12, as his team won their sixth consecutive title.

Despite interest from clubs including Bayer Leverkusen and Tottenham Hotspur, Fortounis' contract with Olympiacos was extended to 2020. He scored his first goal of the 2016–17 season on 2 October 2016 in the 3–0 home derby win against AEK. On 24 November 2016, in a UEFA Europa League group stage he scored from a free-kick to open scoring in a final 1–1 home draw against BSC Young Boys and was chosen MVP of the match. On 28 February 2017, he helped his club, as a substitute, to escape with a vital 2–1 away win for the quarter-finals of Greek Cup, against Atromitos by equalizing the score and giving the assist for the winning goal. On 5 April 2017, he opened the score in a crucial 2–0 away win against Kerkyra, helping his club in their effort to win the 7th consecutive championship. He finished the season with 40 appearances (8 goals, 8 assists) in all competitions.

Fortounis scored twice in a 4–1 home win against AEL on the opening day of the 2017–18 Superleague season, and the following week scored the only goal of the visit to Lamia from the penalty spot. On 14 October, he was the man of the match away to Panionios; after providing the assist for Pape Abou Cissé's early equaliser, he won and then converted the late penalty that gave his side a 4–3 win. In March 2018, Fortounis opened the scoring with a penalty in the home derby with Panathinaikos, played behind closed doors as punishment for misbehaviour by supporters; the match ended 1–1. He finished the season with 37 appearances (11 goals, 14 assists) in all competitions.

He was named Olympiacos captain in August 2018. He contributed two goals and an assist to his team beating 10-man Burnley in the Europa League play-off round. After two goals and an assist in a 5–1 defeat of F91 Dudelange in the Europa League group stage in November 2018, Fortounis was named in the tournament's Team of the Week. On 13 December against AC Milan, he converted an 81st-minute penalty that gave Olympiacos the two-goal winning margin needed to qualify for the knockout rounds. On 30 January 2019, Fortounis scored a hat-trick at home to Larissa, and three weeks later scored twice in a 4–1 win at home to champions AEK Athens. His free kick on 21 April 2019 in a 3–1 away win against Lamia was in vain as PAOK beat Levadiakos to secure the Superleague title. Fortounis finished the season with 43 appearances (17 goals, 16 assists) in all competitions.

Fortounis agreed a new four-year contract in June 2019. In July, he suffered a ruptured cruciate ligament and was expected to be out for six months.

On 15 January 2020, after a very difficult year for the Greek international marred by injury (184 days to be exact), Fortounis made his return as a substitute in a 4–1 home Greek Cup last 16 game against Kalamata.
On 15 February 2020, he scored his first goal after his serious injury for the 2019–20 season, in stylish fashion as the Greek international skipped passed them with a minimum of fuss before scoring with an emphatic shot in a hammering 4–0 home win against Panionios. Fortounis finished the season with 21 appearances (3 goals, 3 assists) in all competitions.

On 18 September 2020, in the 2020-21 Super League Greece opener game, the entry of Fortounis in the beginning of the second half, along with his first goal in the season, changed the image of the match and Olympiakos started the championship with a 3-0 home win against Asteras Tripoli. On 24 October 2020, according to club's reports, Fortounis rejected a €3 million per year offer for a three-year contract from Saudi Arabia club Al Nassr FC. Fortounis finished the season with 46 appearances (9 goals, 11 assists) in all competitions.

On 27 June 2021,  he twisted into an unsuspecting phase during the first test match against Wolfsberger AC, resulting in a cruciate ligament rupture in his left knee. Two years ago he suffered the same injury to his right knee in another test match against Hamburger SV (early July) and was out of action for six months.

International career
He has represented Greece at U-21, U-19 and U-17 level.

Fortounis' debut with the Greece came against Belgium in February 2012 as a suspension with the U-21 side allowed Fernando Santos to call-up the Kaiserslautern's prospect to the senior squad. Showing plenty of maturity against the Belgians, Fortounis was also given test runs against Slovenia and Armenia in the final two Greece friendlies ahead of UEFA Euro 2012. Strong runs down the left flank in Greece's friendlies allowed Fortounis to form a strong bond with the likes of Giorgos Karagounis and José Holebas down the left side; thus forming a strong chemistry between the trio all the while improving Greece's transition game and attack. Eventually was picked in the Greece squad for Euro 2012.

Fortounis was not a part of the Greece national team squad for 2014 FIFA World Cup in Brazil. Eventually his transfer to Olympiacos was beneficial for his career. He started playing again for the national team, being a key player for the squad.
On 29 March 2016, on the 19th minute he converts the penalty with a right footed shot to the bottom right corner and 12 minutes later, with a right footed shot from the centre of the box to the bottom left corner, gave a 2–0 lead in a lost 2–3 friendly international game against Iceland.
On 8 October 2016, after a solid performance against Cyprus that sealed with a 2–0 victory, the international attacking midfielder has suffered an injury and will miss away match of Greece National Team against Estonia on 10 October.

Style of play
Fortounis’ ability to combine well with his colleagues down the flank, while also being able to drive the net in order to create a goal-scoring opportunity. Fortounis’ speed on and off the ball make him an efficient player to have in the line-up as his time with the ball usually creates an attack for his team. His speed is another factor that is to his benefit, as he is able to burst past markers with flair and trickery. He describes himself as a player who can find gaps in the opposition defence but not particularly good at dribbling or one-on-ones.

Career statistics

Club
As of 13 February 2023

International

Honours

Club
Olympiacos
Super League Greece: 2014–15, 2015–16, 2016–17, 2019–20, 2020–21, 2021–22
Greek Cup: 2014–15, 2019–20; runner-up: 2015–16, 2020–21

Individual
UEFA European Under-19 Championship Team of the Tournament: 2011
Super League Greece Player of the Year: 2015–16, 2018–19
Super League Greece Greek Player of the Year: 2015–16, 2018–19
Super League Greece Top goalscorer: 2015–16 
Super League Greece Team of the Year: 2015–16, 2016–17, 2018–19
Super League Greece Top assist provider: 2015–16, 2017–18, 2018–19, 2020–21 
Super League Greece–Fantasy League Award Top Attacking Midfielder of the Regular Season: 2020–21 
Super League Greece Player of the Month: November 2020
Greek Cup Top assist provider: 2020–21
Olympiacos Goal of the Season: 2015–16 (vs Asteras Tripolis)
UEFA Champions League Team of the Week: 2015–16 Round 2
UEFA Europa League Team of the Week: 2016–17 Round 5, 2018–19 Round 4

References

External links

 
 
 
 
 

1992 births
Living people
Greek footballers
Greek expatriate footballers
Trikala F.C. players
Asteras Tripolis F.C. players
1. FC Kaiserslautern players
Olympiacos F.C. players
Olympiacos F.C. B players
Super League Greece players
Super League Greece 2 players
Delta Ethniki players
Bundesliga players
2. Bundesliga players
Expatriate footballers in Germany
Greece youth international footballers
Greece under-21 international footballers
Greece international footballers
UEFA Euro 2012 players
Footballers from Trikala
Association football midfielders